Kenneth Stephen Brown (born 1945) is a professor of mathematics at Cornell University, working in category theory and cohomology theory. Among other things, he is known for Ken Brown's lemma in the theory of model categories.
He is also the author of the book Cohomology of Groups (Graduate Texts in Mathematics 87, Springer, 1982).

Brown earned his Ph.D. in 1971 from the Massachusetts Institute of Technology, under the supervision of Daniel Quillen, with thesis Abstract Homotopy Theory and Generalized Sheaf Cohomology. 
He was an invited speaker at the International Congress of Mathematicians in 1978 in Helsinki.
In 2012 he became a fellow of the American Mathematical Society.

References

1945 births
Place of birth missing (living people)
Living people
20th-century American mathematicians
21st-century American mathematicians
Massachusetts Institute of Technology School of Science alumni
Cornell University faculty
Fellows of the American Mathematical Society
Category theorists
Topologists